Radio Oscar C is a Herzegovina commercial radio station, broadcasting from Mostar, Bosnia and Herzegovina.

Frequencies
The program is currently broadcast on 5 frequencies:

 Mostar  
 Grude  
 Međugorje 
 Neum 
 Stolac

See also 
List of radio stations in Bosnia and Herzegovina

References

External links 
 oscarc.in
 Communications Regulatory Agency of Bosnia and Herzegovina
 Radio Oscar C page on Facebook

Mostar
Radio stations established in 2019
Mass media in Mostar